Miklajung may refer to:

Miklajung, Morang, a rural municipality in Morang
Miklajung, Panchthar, a rural municipality in Panchthar